FenCon is a literary science fiction and fantasy convention with filk held each year on or around the fourth full weekend of September in or around Dallas, Texas. The name is derived from "fen", the fannish plural of "fan", and "con", an abbreviation for "convention".

FenCon is a production of the Dallas Future Society, a non-profit 501(c)(3) corporation that seeks to promote the advancement of science, literature, and music for all mankind. This is the same organization that has run WhoFest, a Doctor Who-focused media-oriented science fiction convention, since 2013.

Programming
Notable features of FenCon include science programming, writing panels, fan discussions, gaming, a diverse selection of guests, an art show and auction, a dealers room, youth and adult short story contests, a writers workshop, "FenKids" children's programming, and the FenCon Saturday Night Cabaret.

While not a filk music convention, FenCon is noted for its quantity and variety of filk programming, performances, and performers. The Texas Filk Page describes FenCon as "the premier filk event in Texas." The Dallas Observer has called FenCon "the region's hottest fan-run literary sci-fi and fantasy convention". but "you don't have to be a bookworm to enjoy this jam-packed weekend of guests, music, films, television, workshops and games."

FenCon was named one of the "Best Literary and Book Events in D/FW" by KTVT in August 2011. The CBS affiliate cited FenCon as "the place to be this September". Tor.com notes that FenCon has "quickly established an enviable reputation among regular convention goers".

In addition to the educational and social aspects of FenCon, an external charity of interest to the membership is chosen each year to be the beneficiary of an annual charity auction and limited-edition cover art print sale. FenCon absorbs all the costs associated with creating these art prints so the entire donation goes directly to the designated charity. As of FenCon X, more than $22,000 has been raised for these charities.

In 2007, FenCon IV hosted the 2007 Lone Star Shindig, a Texas-wide gathering of Firefly fans. The Shindig is a convention within a convention, hosted each year by a different local group each year.  In 2009, FenCon VI hosted the Region Three Summit for Starfleet International, an annual gathering of Star Trek fans from Texas and Louisiana. In 2011, FenCon VIII served as DeepSouthCon 49, an annual gathering of science fiction fans from across the southeastern United States.

Location
FenCon I through FenCon III were held at the Holiday Inn Select North Dallas, in Farmers Branch, Texas, just north of the Dallas city limits. As the membership increased and the programming expanded each year, more and more of the hotel's function space was used. By the end of FenCon III it was clear to the organizers that for the event to continue to grow the convention would have to relocate. FenCon IV through FenCon XI were held at the Crowne Plaza North Dallas in the northern Dallas suburb of Addison, Texas. Starting with FenCon XII, the convention will be held at the Westin Dallas/Fort Worth Airport Hotel in Irving, Texas.

Past conventions

2000s

2004 - FenCon 
FenCon was held September 24–26, 2004, at the Holiday Inn Select North Dallas in Farmers Branch, Texas. Featured guests included Guest of Honor Larry Niven, Filk Guest Michael Longcor, Fen Guest Jim Murray, Toastmaster Elizabeth Moon, plus Special Guests Joe R. Lansdale and Ardath Mayhar. Other notable guests included horror writer Charlee Jacob. The con chair was Michael Nelson. The theme of the convention, now the event's motto, was "Of the Fen, By the Fen, and For the Fen."

2005 - FenCon II 
FenCon II was held September 23–25, 2005, at the Holiday Inn Select North Dallas in Farmers Branch, Texas. Featured guests included Guest of Honor S. M. Stirling, Music Guest Leslie Fish, Artist Guest Larry Dixon, Fen Guest Randy Farran, Toastmaster David Gerrold, and Special Guest Mike Resnick. The con chair was Michael Nelson. The theme of the convention was "What If?" to tie into the alternate history works of several of the featured guests.

FenCon had planned to add a charity auction in its second year with the intent of giving the money to a literacy charity in north Texas. However, because FenCon II took place just after Hurricane Katrina and during Hurricane Rita it was decided to direct any charity efforts to disaster relief. Artist GoH Larry Dixon suggested that a limited-edition print of that year's program book cover art be sold to raise additional funds. FenCon produced prints of the cover art for both FenCon (art by Cat Conrad) and FenCon II (art by Larry Dixon) in a signed and numbered edition of 50 prints each. These prints combined with donation jars and the charity auction to raise $3500 which was donated to the Salvation Army for hurricane disaster relief.

2006 - FenCon III 
FenCon III was held September 22–24, 2006, at the Holiday Inn Select North Dallas in Farmers Branch, Texas. Featured guests included Guest of Honor Alan Dean Foster, Music Guest Heather Alexander, Artist Guest Darrell K. Sweet, Toastmaster Jim Butcher, Special Guest Lawrence Watt-Evans, and Fen Guest Judith Ward. Ward died on July 3, 2006, due to complications from diabetes but remained Fen GoH. The con chair was Tim Miller. The theme of the convention was "Sci-Fi Camp" with a camping theme given to convention signage and publications plus convention volunteers wearing "Camp Staff" shirts.

FenCon once again held an auction and sold a limited-edition art print to raise funds for a charity. This year the designated charity was the American Diabetes Association, selected to honor the memory of "Admiral" Judith Ward. Artist GoH Darrell K. Sweet supplied the program book cover art for that year's print, again each signed and numbered to 50 prints. $1400 was raised and donated to the American Diabetes Association.

2007 - FenCon IV 
FenCon IV was held September 21–23, 2007, at the Crowne Plaza North Dallas in Addison, Texas. Featured guests included Guest of Honor Connie Willis, Music Guest Tom Smith, Artist Guest David Mattingly, Fen Guest Kathleen Sloan, Toastmaster Steve Perry, Special Guest Toni Weisskopf, and Lone Star Shindig Guest Jarrod Davis of Zoic Studios. The con chair was Tim Miller.  The theme of the convention was "Fentastic Four," a play on words in recognition of this being FenCon's fourth year in existence.

As part of the effort to spread the word about the upcoming convention, FenCon volunteers twice manned phone banks in 2007 for Dallas public television station KERA-TV in support of their returning science fiction programming to their regular schedule. FenCon team members also threw room parties or manned fan tables at ConDFW, Aggiecon, the National Space Society's 2007 International Space Development Conference, ApolloCon, Dallas Comic Con, Conestoga, ArmadilloCon, and several other regional events.

FenCon held an auction and sold a limited-edition art print to raise funds for a designated charity. For 2007, this charity was the North Texas Food Bank and a grand total of $2000 was raised and donated at FenCon IV. The NTFB "passionately pursues a hunger-free community." In 2007, the NTFB distributed 32 million pounds of food to 764 feeding and education programs in 13 North Texas counties. Artist GoH David Mattingly provided the art for this year's signed and numbered limited-edition print.

2008 - FenCon V 
FenCon V was held on October 3–5, 2008, at the Crowne Plaza North Dallas in Addison, Texas. This year marked the 50th anniversary of the first science fiction convention in Texas: Southwestercon 6 held in July, 1958, in Dallas. Anniversary events, Texas-themed programming, and special guests were scheduled to help commemorate this date. Featured guests included Guest of Honor Gregory Benford, Music Guest Three Weird Sisters, Fen Guest Gerald Burton, Artist Guest Real Musgrave the creator of Pocket Dragons, ORAC Special Guest Doris Egan, plus Special Guest and writers workshop instructor Jay Lake. The con chair was Russ Miller. Toastmaster Howard Waldrop was unable to attend due to health concerns.

FenCon held an auction and sold a limited-edition art print to raise money for that year's designated charity.  A total of $2130 was raised and donated to Radio & Reading Resources of North Texas, a radio reading service, for their programs to bring the printed word to the visually disabled. Artist GoH Real Musgrave provided the art for this year's signed and numbered limited-edition print.

A similarly named media convention, FedConUSA, was also held in Dallas in 2008. FedConUSA, which shutdown mid-event, was not connected in any way to FenCon.

2009 - FenCon VI 
FenCon VI was held on September 18–20, 2009, at the Crowne Plaza North Dallas in Addison, Texas.  Featured guests included Guest of Honor Lois McMaster Bujold, Music Guest of Honor Carla Ulbrich, Fen Guest of Honor Warren Buff, Artist Guest of Honor Kurt Miller, Toastmaster Paul Cornell, plus Special Guests Keith R.A. DeCandido and Howard Waldrop. Also attending were former FenCon honored guests Randy Farran, Gerald Burton, Tom Smith, and Real Musgrave as part of FenCon VI's roughly 100 program participants.  The con chair was Russ Miller. This convention's theme was "Sci-Fi DIY".

With the charity auction and sales of the Kurt Miller limited-edition art print, more than $2700 was raised for Genesis Women's Shelter, an organization providing safety and shelter to battered women and their children in the greater Dallas area.  FenCon VI served as the host site for the annual Summit of Starfleet International's Region Three, a gathering of Star Trek fans from across Louisiana and Texas.  Control of FenCon was ceremonially handed over from FenCon V & VI chair Russ Miller to incoming FenCon VII chair Julie Barrett with presentation of the "Dead Con Chair Sketch" during closing ceremonies.

2010s

2010 - FenCon VII 
FenCon VII was held on September 17–19, 2010, at the Crowne Plaza North Dallas in Addison, Texas.  This convention's theme was "Mad Science".  Featured guests included Guests of Honor Spider Robinson & Jeanne Robinson, Music Guests of Honor Jeff and Maya Bohnhoff, Fen Guests of Honor Kevin Roche & Andrew Trembley, Artist Guest of Honor John Picacio, Toastmaster Joe R. Lansdale, Science Guest of Honor Doctor John N. Randall plus Special Guests author Robert J. Sawyer and editor Jessica Wade.  The con chair was Julie Barrett. In keeping with the theme, staff and convention T-shirts depict a 'mad' periodic table of fictional fannish elements such as "Filkoneum" and "Literanium".

Guest of honor Jeanne Robinson died on May 30, 2010, but per FenCon tradition she remained an honored guest. Her husband, author Spider Robinson, was unable to attend in person as planned but appeared "virtually" through internet video conferencing. With the charity auction and sales of the John Picacio limited-edition art print, more than $1730 was raised for Carter BloodCare, an organization providing life-saving blood to 54 counties in North Central and East Texas. In addition, members donated 40 units of blood during a blood drive at FenCon on Saturday, September 18.

2011 - FenCon VIII 
FenCon VIII was held from September 23–25, 2011, at the Crowne Plaza North Dallas in Addison, Texas. Guests included Guest of Honor Gail Carriger, Music Guest of Honor Joe Bethancourt, Fen Guest of Honor Steven H Silver, Artist Guest of Honor Vincent DiFate, Science Guest of Honor Les Johnson, Toastmaster Bradley Denton, Special Guest Stephan Martinière, plus Special Guest Lou Anders who also ran the writers workshop. This convention hosted DeepSouthCon 49, the first DeepSouthCon to be held in the state of Texas. This convention's theme was "Southern Steam" and the con chair was Julie Barrett. In keeping with the theme, the staff T-shirts depicted a steam locomotive engine and the convention shirts featured Leonardo da Vinci-inspired artwork by Mel. White.

After winning the DeepSouthCon 49 bid in 2009 at Hypericon (DeepSouthCon 47) in Nashville, Tennessee, FenCon promoted the 2011 convention at Texas-based events in Houston, Austin, College Station, Irving, and Dallas as well as travelling to ConCarolinas in Charlotte, North Carolina, to Soonercon in Oklahoma City, Oklahoma, to ConQuesT in Kansas City, Missouri, and to LibertyCon in Chattanooga, Tennessee.

Vincent DiFate could not attend in person but appeared virtually through phone relays and remote video presentations. The annual charity auction and Vincent Di Fate limited-edition art print combined to raise around $2000 for the Habitat for Humanity of South Collin County. As part of DeepSouthCon, the Rebel Award was presented to Brad W. Foster, the Phoenix Award to Selina Rosen, the Rubble Award to LoneStarCon 3 chair Bill Parker, and the Hearts Tournament was won by Ruth Cruise.

2012 - FenCon IX 
FenCon IX was held from September 21–23, 2012, at the Crowne Plaza North Dallas in Addison, Texas. Honored guests included Guest of Honor C. J. Cherryh, Music Guest of Honor John Anealio, Artist Guest of Honor Donato Giancola, Science Guest of Honor Dr. David Hanson, Fan Guest of Honor Teresa Patterson, and Toastmaster Peter A. David. Special guest Karl Schroeder led the writers' workshop. Guest Speaker Stanley G. Love discussed NASA and his career as an astronaut. This convention's theme was "The Future's So Bright..." and the convention chair was Tim Morgan.

The annual charity auction and limited-edition Donato Giancola art print raised more than $3,100 to benefit Literacy Instruction For Texas, a Dallas-based program teaching "illiterate and low literate adults" to read English. Key events included "FenCon Squares" with celebrity panelists and Joe Dalek in the center square.

2013 - FenCon X 
FenCon X was held October 4–6, 2013, at the Crowne Plaza North Dallas in Addison, Texas. The convention was held later than normal because LoneStarCon 3, the 71st World Science Fiction Convention, was scheduled for August 29-September 2, 2013, in San Antonio, Texas. Key program participants included Guest of Honor Cory Doctorow, Music Guest of Honor Heather Dale, Fan Guest of Honor Tom Smith, Artist Guest of Honor Charles Vess, Science Guest of Honor Geoffrey A. Landis, Special Young Adult Author Guest Amber Benson, Toastmaster John Ringo, Special Guests Patrick Nielsen Hayden and Teresa Nielsen Hayden, and Special Gaming Guest Sandy Petersen. The theme of this convention was "Infinite Possibilities". The convention chair was Tim Morgan.

The annual charity auction and limited-edition Charles Vess art print raised more than $4,000 to benefit Autism Treatment Center, a Dallas-based program individuals with autism as they "learn, play, work, and live in the community". Key events included a scooter polo match between guests of honor and panels discussing the 50th anniversary of Doctor Who. Participation by science panelists who are also NASA employees was disrupted by the United States federal government shutdown of 2013. FenCon X was also a stop on Steven Brust's book tour for The Incrementalists.

2014 - FenCon XI 
FenCon XI was held September 26–28, 2014, at the Crowne Plaza North Dallas in Addison, Texas. Key program participants included Guest of Honor Eric Flint, Music Guest of Honor Ookla the Mok, Fan Guest of Honor Geri Sullivan, Artist Guest of Honor Rick Sternbach, Science Guest of Honor J. Storrs Hall, Toastmaster Timothy Zahn, Special Workshop Guest Carrie Vaughn, Special Artist Guest R. Cat Conrad, and Special Gaming Guest Steve Jackson. The theme of this convention was "The University of FenCon: A New Degree In Fandom". The convention chair was Tim Miller, also chair of FenCon III and FenCon IV.

FenCon held an auction and sold a limited-edition art print to raise more than $2,500 for that year's designated charity, Children's Advocacy Center of Collin County. Artist GoH Rick Sternbach provided the art for this year's signed and numbered limited-edition print. In addition to the main "University of FenCon" T-shirts, a limited edition "Fighting Greys" athletic department mascot shirt was sold to raise funds for the Dallas Future Society.

2015 - FenCon XII 
FenCon XII was held September 25–27, 2015, at the Westin Dallas/Fort Worth Airport in Irving, Texas. Key program participants included Guest of Honor S. M. Stirling, Artist Guest of Honor Mitch Bentley, Music Guest of Honor Tricky Pixie, Fan Guest of Honor Tadao Tomomatsu, Science Guest of Honor Dr. Penny Boston, Special Workshop Guest Jaye Wells, and Special Gaming Guest Rick Loomis. The theme of this convention was "It's About Time...". The convention chair was Russ Miller, also chair of FenCon V and FenCon VI.

2016 - FenCon XIII 
FenCon XIII was held September 23–25, 2016, at the Westin Dallas/Fort Worth Airport in Irving, Texas. Key program participants included Guest of Honor Jim C. Hines, Artist Guest of Honor Kristine Carroll, Music Guest of Honor Bill Sutton and Brenda Sutton, Fan Guest of Honor Sara Felix, Science Guest of Honor Michael S. Brotherton, Toastmaster Esther Friesner, Special Workshop Guest Rachel Swirsky, Special Gaming Guest Tiffany Franzoni, and Special Music Guest Mary Crowell. The theme of this convention was "Magical Journeys". The convention chair was Julie Barrett, also chair of FenCon VII and FenCon VIII.

Additionally, FenCon was the host site for the 2016 1632 MiniCon.  Author Eric Flint and other authors of 1632-related books were guests.

2017 - FenCon XIV 
FenCon XIV was held September 22–24, 2017, at the Westin Dallas/Fort Worth Airport in Irving, Texas.  Key program participants included Guest of Honor Kevin J. Anderson, Artist Guest of Honor Tom Kidd, Music Guest of Honor Vixy and Tony, Fan Guest of Honor Ben Yalow, Special Science Guest Speaker Dr. Stanley G. Love, Toastmaster Selina Rosen, Special Music Guest Leslie Hudson, Special Gaming Guest J. R. Honeycutt and Special Workshop Guest Cat Rambo.

Charles Stross, who was due to be Guest of Honor, withdrew from the convention as a protest of Donald Trump's Ban on Muslim Immigration. The theme of this convention was "Beyond the Stars". The convention chair was Ellen Braun.

2018 - FenCon XV 
FenCon XV was held September 21–23, 2018, at the Westin Dallas/Fort Worth Airport in Irving, Texas.  Key program participants included Special Guest of Honor Larry Niven, Music Guest of Honor Marian Call, Fen Guests of Honor Aislinn Burrows and Carmen Bryan, Artist Guest of Honor Travis Lewis, Science Guest of Honor Marianne J. Dyson, Special Workshop Guest Martha Wells and Toastmaster Timothy Griffin. The theme of this convention was "It's Alive!  200 Years of Science Fiction". The convention chairs were Meredith Hines, Jim Mahaffey, and Julie Barrett.

2019 - FenCon XVI 
FenCon XVI was held September 20–22, 2019, at the Sheraton DFW Airport in Irving, Texas.  Key program participants included Guest of Honor Trevor Quachri, Music Guest of Honor The Doubleclicks, Fen Guest of Honor Helen Montgomery, Artist Guest of Honor Peri Charlifu, Science Guest of Honor Julie Czerneda, Special Workshop Guest Angie Hodapp, and Toastmaster Mark Finn. The theme of this convention was "Gateway to the Future". The convention chairs were Robin Wynans and Rhonda Eudaly.

Upcoming conventions

2021 - FenCon XVII 
FenCon XVII will be held 17–19 September 2021, at the Sheraton DFW Airport in Irving, Texas.  Key program participants include Guest of Honor Adam-Troy Castro, Music Guest of Honor Jodi Krangle, Fen Guest of Honor Renee Babcock, Artist Guest of Honor Chaz Kemp, Science Guest of Honor Benjamin C. Kinney, and Toastmaster Maurice Broaddus. The theme of this convention is "Jazzing Up 2021". The convention chairs are Rhonda Eudaly and Sarah Brigdon. 2020 was cancelled caused by the COVID-19 pandemic.

References

External links
FenCon official website

Dallas Future Society
History of the Dallas Futurians (1954-1959) and the Houston Science Fiction Society (1965-1980)

2004 establishments in Texas
Science fiction conventions in the United States
Conventions in Texas
Fantasy conventions
Festivals in Dallas
Filk music
Recurring events established in 2004